Dendermonde-Sint-Niklaas was a constituency used to elect members of the Belgian Chamber of Representatives between 1995 and 2003.

Representatives

References

Defunct constituencies of the Chamber of Representatives (Belgium)